Hanns Kerrl (11 December 1887 – 14 December 1941) was a German Nazi politician. His most prominent position, from July 1935, was that of Reichsminister of Church Affairs. He was also President of the Prussian Landtag (1932–1933) and head of the Zweckverband Reichsparteitag Nürnberg and in that capacity edited a number of Nuremberg rally yearbooks.

Early life
Kerrl was born into a Protestant family in Fallersleben; his father was a headmaster. He served in the German Army in the First World War as a Leutnant earning the Iron Cross 1st and 2nd Class. He joined the Nazi Party (NSDAP) in 1923 and soon afterwards went into regional politics. A member of the Sturmabteilung, Kerrl would ultimately hold the rank of SA-Obergruppenführer.

Early Nazi career
Joining the Nazi Party in 1923, he founded and led an Ortsgruppe (Local Group) in Peine, a suburb of Hanover. In the fall of 1925, Kerrl became a member of the National Socialist Working Association, a short-lived group of north and northwest German Gaue, organized and led by Gregor Strasser, which unsuccessfully sought to amend the Party program. It was dissolved in 1926 following the Bamberg Conference.

An associate of Bernhard Rust, the local Gauleiter, in 1928 Kerrl became the Kreisleiter of Peine District. Also elected to the Landtag of Prussia in 1928, he served as head of the Nazi faction and, on 24 May 1932 after the Nazis won the largest number of seats in the April election, he became President of the assembly. He remained in this position until the Landtag was finally dissolved on 14 October 1933, in the wake of the Nazi subordination of the German States to the Reich government. After the Nazi seizure of power, Kerrl was appointed Reich Commissioner to the Prussian Ministry of Justice on 23 March 1933 and on 21 April was made Minister of Justice, serving until June 1934. In this position, Kerrl placed a ban on Jewish notaries preparing official documents and banned Jewish lawyers from practicing in Prussia. In September 1933 he was made a member of the Prussian State Council. He also was named to the Academy for German Law and sat on its präsidium (standing committee). Kerrl was elected to the Reichstag for electoral constituency 16, South Hanover-Brunswick, in November 1933. When the Reichstag convened on 12 December, he was named First Deputy President to Reichstag President Hermann Göring and would serve in this capacity until his death. On 17 June 1934, Kerrl entered the national Reich cabinet as a Reichsminister without Portfolio.

Minister of Ecclesiastical Affairs
In the following year, on 16 July 1935, he was appointed Reichsminister of the newly created Reich Ministry for Church Affairs. On the one hand, Kerrl was supposed to mediate between those Nazi leaders who hated Christianity (for example Heinrich Himmler) and the churches themselves and stress the religious aspect of the Nazi ideology. On the other hand, in tune with the policy of Gleichschaltung, it was Kerrl's job to subjugate the churches—subject the various denominations and their leaders and subordinate them to the greater goals decided by the Führer, Adolf Hitler. Indeed, Kerrl had been appointed after Ludwig Müller had been unsuccessful in getting the Protestants to unite in one "Reich Church."

Kerrl was considered one of the milder Nazis, nonetheless, in a speech before several compliant church leaders on 13 February 1937, he revealed the regime's growing hostility to the church when he declared: "Positive Christianity  National Socialism .... True Christianity is represented by the party .... the Führer is the herald of a new revelation." Kerrl liked to refer to Hitler as "Germany's Jesus Christ."
 He also pressured most of the Protestant pastors to swear an oath of loyalty to Hitler.

Gregory Munro (Australian Catholic University, Brisbane) states that:

Increasingly marginalized by Hitler, who did not even grant him a personal conversation, Kerrl became desperate and embittered. A completely powerless minister, he died in office on 14 December 1941, aged 54. He was succeeded by Hermann Muhs.

Aryanization of the Lindemann house 
From 1935 to 1941 Kerrl lived at Rupenhorn 5 at Stößensee in Berlin in a house that had been Aryanized, that is forcibly sold, from its Jewish owner, Paul Lindemann. The Lindemann Haus, built in 1928/29 by architect Bruno Paul, was acquired in 1935 by Kerrl when Lindemann was forced to sell by the Nazis.

Personality
The American diplomat, William Russell wrote in his memoir (Berlin Embassy) that Kerrl frequented "Berlin dives" and bars "until the wee hours of the morning".

References

Further reading 
 John S. Conway: The Nazi Persecution of the Churches 1933–1945 (London, 1968).

External links

 
 
 

1887 births
1941 deaths
Christian fascists
German Army personnel of World War I
German Protestants
Justice ministers of Prussia
Members of the Academy for German Law
Members of the Landtag of Prussia
Members of the Reichstag of Nazi Germany
National Socialist Working Association members
Nazi Germany ministers
Nazi Party officials
Nazi Party politicians
People from Wolfsburg
Recipients of the Iron Cross (1914), 1st class
Recipients of the Iron Cross (1914), 2nd class
Sturmabteilung officers